The silvery-cheeked antshrike (Sakesphoroides cristatus) is a species of bird in the family Thamnophilidae, the antbirds. It is the only member of the monotypic genus Sakesphoroides. Prior to 2022, it was classified in the genus Sakesphorus, but it was reclassified into its own genus by the International Ornithological Congress based on the results of a 2021 molecular study.

It is endemic to Brazil. Its natural habitats are subtropical or tropical dry forests and subtropical or tropical dry shrubland.

References

silvery-cheeked antshrike
Birds of the Caatinga
Endemic birds of Brazil
silvery-cheeked antshrike
Taxonomy articles created by Polbot